During the 1988–89 English football season, Brentford competed in the Football League Third Division. The gruelling 63-match season is best remembered for the Bees' run to the sixth round of the FA Cup. Brentford narrowly failed to qualify for the play-offs, but the club's final placing of 7th was its highest in the league pyramid since the 1964–65 season.

Season summary 

After a disappointing end to what was a positive first full season in charge, Brentford manager Steve Perryman identified that his principle starting XI would be complete with a creative winger and a reliable goalscoring forward. Perryman broke the Bees' incoming transfer record by spending £77,500 on Sheffield United forward Richard Cadette in July 1988. Perryman brought experienced winger Neil Smillie back to Griffin Park, 11 years after Smillie had initially played for the Bees on loan. Also arriving at Griffin Park was goalkeeper Tony Parks from Tottenham Hotspur for a £60,000 fee and replaced Gary Phillips, who joined Reading for £25,000. On the eve of the season, right back Roger Joseph, who had been named in the 1987–88 Third Division PFA Team of the Year, joined Wimbledon for a new club record outgoing transfer fee of £150,000.

Brentford enjoyed one of the most exciting seasons in years, producing some notable results in both the Third Division and the cup competitions. The Bees trod water in mid-table for most of the season, before a run of eight wins and two draws from a 10-match spell in March and April 1989 raised the club to 7th position, one place outside the play-off zone, despite the club record £350,000 sale of influential midfielder Andy Sinton to Queens Park Rangers. Two consecutive defeats in early May left Brentford in 9th place, still with a chance of a play-off finish going into the final two matches of the season, but a 1–1 draw with Swansea City at Griffin Park in the penultimate match of the season ended any mathematical chances. Despite drawing the final match of the season, defeats for former play-off-contending rivals Chester City and Notts County raised Brentford to a credible 7th-place finish.

In the cup competitions, Brentford advanced to the second round of the League Cup and the Southern Area semi-finals of the Football League Trophy. Notably the Bees faced local rivals Fulham in both competitions and in the Third Division, winning two, drawing two and losing one of the five matches between the sides during the season. In the FA Cup, Brentford advanced to the sixth round for the first time since the 1948–49 season. Non-league club Halesowen Town were dispatched in the first round, but it took replays to see off Peterborough United and Walsall in the second and third rounds respectively. The Bees faced high-flying Second Division club Manchester City in the fourth round at a sold-out Griffin Park and emerged 3–1 victors thanks to a Gary Blissett brace and one goal from Keith Jones. Brentford also drew promotion-chasing Second Division opposition in the fifth round – Blackburn Rovers at Ewood Park. 3,000 travelling supporters watched Brentford hold Rovers at 0–0 until the 80th minute, when Gary Blissett scored the first of the only two goals of the match to put the Bees into the hat for the sixth round. Brentford were drawn against First Division giants Liverpool at Anfield, for a match which would be one of the club's biggest occasions of the postwar era. Steve McMahon opened the scoring after 15 minutes and the Bees held firm until midway through the second half, when three Liverpool goals in a 16-minute spell saw the match finish with an unflattering 4–0 scoreline.

Central defender Terry Evans missed just one match during the season and finished with 62 appearances, the club record for a player in a single season.

League table

Results
Brentford's goal tally listed first.

Legend

Pre-season

Football League Third Division

FA Cup

Football League Cup

Football League Trophy 

 Sources: 100 Years of Brentford, The Big Brentford Book of the Eighties, Statto

Playing squad 
Players' ages are as of the opening day of the 1988–89 season.

 Sources: The Big Brentford Book of the Eighties, Timeless Bees

Coaching staff

Statistics

Appearances and goals
Substitute appearances in brackets.

Players listed in italics left the club mid-season.
Source: The Big Brentford Book of the Eighties

Goalscorers 

Players listed in italics left the club mid-season.
Source: The Big Brentford Book of the Eighties

Management

Summary

Transfers & loans

Kit

|
|

Awards 
 Supporters' Player of the Year: Terry Evans
 Players' Player of the Year: Terry Evans
 Football League Third Division Manager of the Month: Steve Perryman (February 1989)
 Evening Standard Player of the Month: Terry Evans (January 1989), Gary Blissett (February 1989)

Notes

References 

Brentford F.C. seasons
Brentford